This article includes three versions of the list of countries by crude birth rate.

Methodology 
Crude birth rate refers to the number of births over a given period divided by the person-years lived by the population over that period. 

It is expressed as number of births per 1,000 population.
Lists 236 countries and territories in 2011 crude birth rate.

The first list is based on World Bank Data for the year 2018.

The second list is based on the Organization for Economic Cooperation and Development (OECD) "2011 annual statistics".

The third, fourth and fifth lists are based on CIA World Factbook estimates for years 2013, 2014 and 2020. Dependent territories and not fully recognized states are not ranked.

The sixth list is provided by Population Reference Bureau.

List

No data for Christmas Island (Australia), Cocos (Keeling) Islands (Australia), Norfolk Island (Australia), Svalbard (Norway) and Vatican City.

References

See also
List of countries by number of births
List of sovereign states and dependencies by total fertility rate
List of countries by population growth rate
Overshoot (population)
Population pyramid
Global catastrophic risk

Birth rate
Birth rate
Birth rate